Gerhard Raspé (born 20 January 1928 in Bucharest, died 1 September 1974 in West Berlin) was a Romanian-born German organic chemist, who served as research director at Schering AG and a member of the company's executive board.

Following his studies of organic chemistry at the Brunswick University of Technology and the University of Madrid, he obtained a doctorate in chemistry (Dr.rer.nat.) and worked as a researcher in the field of steroid hormones and biochemistry at the pharmaceutical company Schering AG. In 1964, he became a member of the executive board of Schering and the company's director of research. He was a board member of the Max Planck Society and a member of the German Council of Science and Humanities. He died in 1974, aged 46.

References

20th-century German chemists
Organic chemists
Schering people
Max Planck Society people
German business executives
Technical University of Braunschweig alumni
Complutense University of Madrid alumni
Scientists from Bucharest
Romanian emigrants to Germany
1928 births
1974 deaths